Fulham is a rural locality in the Somerset Region, Queensland, Australia. In the  Fulham had a population of 35 people.

Geography 
The Deer Reserve State Forest is in the north of the locality.

The Deer Reserve National Park is in the east of the locality.

History 
Fulham State School opened in 1920 and closed circa 1953. It was located at 372 Cressbrook Cabonah Road (southern corner with Fulham Road, now in Cressbrook).

In the  Fulham had a population of 35 people.

References

Further reading 

  — also includes Mount Beppo State School, Ivorys Creek Provisional School, Cross Roads Provisional School, Ottaba Provisional School, Murrumba State School, Mount Esk Pocket School, Kipper Provisional School, Lower Cressbrook School, Fulham School, Sandy Gully State School, Cooeeimbardi State School, Scrub Creek State School

Suburbs of Somerset Region
Localities in Queensland